PAGE family member 1 is a protein that in humans is encoded by the PAGE1 gene.

Function

This gene belongs to a family of genes that are expressed in a variety of tumors but not in normal tissues, except for the testis. Unlike the other gene family members, this gene does not encode an antigenic peptide. Nothing is presently known about the function of this protein.

References